Center Cass School District 66 is a public school district located in Downers Grove, Illinois, in DuPage County.  The district serves about 1,300 students in grades K-8.

Center Cass District 66 currently consists of Elizabeth Ide School (grades K-2), Prairieview Elementary School (grades 3-5) and Lakeview Jr. High School (grades 6-8).  These elementary and junior high schools each feed into Downers Grove South High School (Community High School District 99).  Center Cass School District is named after Center Cass School, which was once a part of the district. Prairieview School was built to replace Center Cass through 1999-2000.

Timeline 
 1862: Center Cass District established K-8 school on SE corner of 83rd and Lemont.
 1951: Center Cass School built on SW corner of 83rd and Lemont K-8.
 1962: Center Cass School District celebrates its 100th anniversary
 1970: Elizabeth Ide School opened on October 13 - grades K-4; Center Cass School grades 5-8.
 1975: Lakeview Jr. High School built in February - grades 6-8; Center Cass School grades 4-5; Elizabeth Ide School K-2.
 1977-1988: Center Cass School was closed and the space was leased.  Elizabeth Ide School grades K-4 and Lakeview Jr. High grades 5-8.
 1980s: Lakeview School received Radio Shack TRS-80 Model III computers.
 1988: Center Cass School reopens for grades 4-5; Elizabeth Ide grades K-3; Lakeview Jr. High grades 6-8.
 1991: Center Cass School grades K-2; Elizabeth Ide grades 3-5; Lakeview Jr. High grades 6-8.
 1999-2000: Prairieview Elementary School was constructed which was used as a replacement for center cass a year before it was demolished.
 2000: Prairieview School opens for grades 3-5; Elizabeth Ide grades K-2; Lakeview Jr. High grades 6-8.
 2000: Center Cass School was demolished on October 30, 2000.
 2002: Lakeview school gets new lockers.
 2003: New ventilation systems were installed in Lakeview School.
 2004: Half of Lakeview School was remodeled.
 2010: Lakeview Schools bathrooms were renovated.
 2010: The bathrooms were also renovated in Elizabeth Ide.
 2011: Enclosed bus parking was constructed between Lakeview School and Prairieview School.
 2011: Drainage pond developed for Lakeview School.
 2012-2013: Lakeview Jr High changes to semesters from trimesters.
 2016: District develops Facility Master Plan as a roadmap to repairing and improving its school buildings for the future.
 2017: The Board proposes a $12.9M General Obligation Building Bond Referendum on the April 4, 2017 Ballot, for renovations to Elizabeth Ide, Prairieview and Lakeview; the Referendum narrowly passes by 71 votes or 3.8% of total votes counted.
 2020: The Board approves $2.4M in debt certificates to pay off the 2010 debt certificates and places remaining $1M into operating reserves.
 2022: The Board issues $750K in Tax Anticipation Warrants in April 2022, to cover expenses.  
 2022: The Board proposes a Referendum to Increase the Limiting Rate by 24% on the June 28, 2022 Ballot for an estimated annual increase of $3M in property tax dollars; the Referendum fails (60% vote "No"; 40% vote "Yes")
 2022: The Board proposes a Referendum to Increase the Limiting Rate by 19% on the November 7, Ballot for an estimated annual increase of $2.5M in property tax dollars; the Referendum narrowly passes by 29 votes or 0.50% of total votes counted.  
 2023: Although the Referendum passed in November 2022, to increase the Limiting Rate by 19%, the Board of Education approves another $750K in Tax Anticipation Warrants, in February 2023.

Center Cass School 
The original Center Cass School was a one-room wooden structure located at Brookeridge. The wooden school burned in 1913 and a one-room concrete replacement was built. In 1915, the count of students and teachers was sixteen. During this period Elizabeth Ide was a teacher. She brought eight gallons of water to school from her house each day because the school's water supply was contaminated. Later, she became the principal. Some of the original foundation of the schoolhouse can still be found today.

In 1951, the last Center Cass School was built. The school was designed by Legat architects and was made to have prairie style architecture. It was extended three times. In 1955 two more rooms were added, in 1960 the gym and classrooms across the gym were added and in 1966 six more classrooms were added. Until 1970 it served grades K-8, when it was replaced by Elizabeth Ide School.  Prior to 1970, in 1968 and 1969, some classes were held in a church on Cass Avenue because there was not enough room for everyone at the school.

Prairieview Elementary School   
Prairieview was built because Center Cass School was too small and had many issues. At Center Cass the gym was used for physical education and band room in the morning, lunch room in the middle of the day, and a hallway to the other side of the building, where classrooms were located. The library was spread out and not very organized,  while the teacher's lunchroom was in the basement where the craft supplies were stored. There was no storage space and many teachers including the band director had to teach in a closet. In 1999, District 66 sold the Center Cass School property and built Prairieview School, which opened in August 2000. Legat architects designed the school to also have prairie style architecture. They incorporated some features from Center Cass School, including windows above the classrooms and a shallowly sloped roof. South Grove Park was supposed to be the building site, but the people voted against it 3 times, so it was moved next to Lakeview.

The school currently holds grades 3 through 5. Names for the school were suggested by the students and The Board of Education chose Prairieview. The school's name for teams, Prairieview Panthers, was chosen by students in a contest.

Lakeview Jr. High School 
The district established a Junior High school because Center Cass School was overcrowded and did not meet accessibility requirements, lacking an elevator. Construction on Lakeview began in 1974 and it opened in February 1975. The school was designed by F.G.M architects. Its name came from the fact that it is located across the street from Bruce Lake. The school's team name is Lakeview Spartans.  Originally built on the "Open School" concept without interior walls and almost no windows, Lakeview has been remodeled several times to add walls, locker banks, another gym, science labs, applied technology STEM room and an improved computer lab, a new administrative office and windows in exterior wall classrooms.

Band program 
Initially only a few bands operated. The ensembles performed mainly for community concerts. The band program started in 4th grade. There was only 1 band director in the early days. As enrollment grew, a second director was added. Eventually, there were 2 full-time directors and 1 general music teacher. Jay Tiede, Ralf Wilhite, Bob Hodac, Paul Windsor, and Brian Olsen and Tom Tedeschi have all held the position of Band D

Demographics 
The District has an enrollment of about 1,115 students as of the 2010–2011 school year, including 71.2% Caucasians, 3.9% African Americans, 6.6% Hispanic, 9.9% Asian, 0.1% Native Hawaiian or Pacific Islander, 0.1% American Indian, and 8.2% of two or more other races. 
Although new homes have been constructed in the District since 2011, enrollment has not increased and, as of Fiscal Year 2022, dropped to 1,084 (for details and trends, see https://www.illinoisreportcard.com/District.aspx?source=studentcharacteristics&source2=enrollment&Districtid=19022066002).

Superintendent 
Superintendent Dr. Jay Tiede retired in 2012 after 39 years of working in the district. He was replaced by Dr. Tim Arnold, who graduated from Illinois State University with a bachelor's degree in Special Education. He earned his master's degree in Educational Leadership at ISU. In July 2019 Tim Arnold resigned as superintendent and was replaced during the 2019-2020 school year by two interim superintendents, Dr. Ray Lechner and Dr. Griff Powell, who served until the hiring of a permanent replacement superintendent, Dr. Andrew Wise, in July 2020. Dr.Wise's original contract was for a 3-year term, through June 2023. Only 8 months into his initial contract, the Board of Education extended his contract by an additional 2 years, through June 2025.

References 

 Illinois School District Report Card (2010–11)
 Questionnaires completed by Superintendent Dr. Jay Tiede, Band Director Mr. Tom Tedeschi, Computer teacher Mrs. Becky Foellmer, 7th grade Social Studies teacher Mr. Jake Little, 6th grade Math teacher Mrs. Karin Snodgrass, 1st grade teacher Mrs. Celeste Amish, 7th grade Language Arts teacher Mrs. Lisa Boyer and Lakeview librarian for 45 years Ms. Susan Hagensee
 "Center Cass School to Celebrate 100th Anniversary Tuesday Evening" Chicago Tribune (1962)
 "New Center Cass School Dedicated" Chicago Tribune (1963)

External links 
 

Downers Grove, Illinois
School districts in DuPage County, Illinois
1862 establishments in Illinois
School districts established in 1862